The local assembly of bishops is the Episcopal Conference of Mozambique (Portuguese: Conferencia Episcopal de Moçambique, CEM). The ECM is a member of the Inter-Regional Meeting of Bishops of Southern Africa (IMBISA) and Symposium of Episcopal Conferences of Africa and Madagascar (SECAM). 

List of presidents of the Bishops' Conference:

1967–1969: Custódio Alvim Pereira, Archbishop of Maputo

1969–1975: Francisco Nunes Teixeira, Bishop of Quelimane

1975–1976: Manuel Vieira Pinto, Archbishop of Nampula

1976–1986: Jaime Pedro Gonçalves, Archbishop of Beira

1986–1993: Paulo Mandlate, Bishop of Tete

1993–2002: Francisco João Silota, Bishop of Chimoio

2002–2006: Jaime Pedro Gonçalves, Archbishop of Beira

2006–2009: Tume Makhweliha, Archbishop of Nampula

From 2009: Lucio Andrice Muandula, Bishop of Xai-Xai

See also
Catholic Church in Mozambique

References

External links
 
 http://www.gcatholic.org/dioceses/country/MZ.htm
 http://www.catholic-hierarchy.org/country/mz.html 

Mozambique
Catholic Church in Mozambique
1967 establishments in Mozambique

it:Chiesa cattolica in Mozambico#Conferenza episcopale